Celestial mechanics is the branch of astronomy that deals with the motions of objects in outer space. Historically, celestial mechanics applies principles of physics (classical mechanics) to astronomical objects, such as stars and planets, to produce ephemeris data.

History

Modern analytic celestial mechanics started with Isaac Newton's Principia of 1687. The name "celestial mechanics" is more recent than that.  Newton wrote that the field should be called "rational mechanics." The term "dynamics" came in a little later with Gottfried Leibniz, and over a century after Newton, Pierre-Simon Laplace introduced the term "celestial mechanics."  Prior to Kepler there was little connection between exact, quantitative prediction of planetary positions, using geometrical or arithmetical techniques, and contemporary discussions of the physical causes of the planets' motion.

Johannes Kepler

Johannes Kepler (1571–1630) was the first to closely integrate the predictive geometrical astronomy, which had been dominant from Ptolemy in the 2nd century to Copernicus, with physical concepts to produce a New Astronomy, Based upon Causes, or Celestial Physics in 1609.  His work led to the modern laws of planetary orbits, which he developed using his physical principles and the planetary observations made by Tycho Brahe. Kepler's model greatly improved the accuracy of predictions of planetary motion, years before Isaac Newton developed his law of gravitation in 1686.

Isaac Newton
Isaac Newton (25 December 1642–31 March 1727) is credited with introducing the idea that the motion of objects in the heavens, such as planets, the Sun, and the Moon, and the motion of objects on the ground, like cannon balls and falling apples, could be described by the same set of physical laws.  In this sense he unified celestial and terrestrial dynamics.  Using Newton's law of universal gravitation, proving Kepler's Laws for the case of a circular orbit is simple. Elliptical orbits involve more complex calculations, which Newton included in his Principia.

Joseph-Louis Lagrange
After Newton, Lagrange (25 January 1736–10 April 1813) attempted to solve the three-body problem, analyzed the stability of planetary orbits, and discovered the existence of the Lagrangian points.  Lagrange also reformulated the principles of classical mechanics, emphasizing energy more than force and developing a method to use a single polar coordinate equation to describe any orbit, even those that are parabolic and hyperbolic. This is useful for calculating the behaviour of planets and comets and such.  More recently, it has also become useful to calculate spacecraft trajectories.

Simon Newcomb
Simon Newcomb (12 March 1835–11 July 1909) was a Canadian-American astronomer who revised Peter Andreas Hansen's table of lunar positions.  In 1877, assisted by George William Hill, he recalculated all the major astronomical constants. After 1884, he conceived with A. M. W. Downing a plan to resolve much international confusion on the subject. By the time he attended a standardisation conference in Paris, France, in May 1886, the international consensus was that all ephemerides should be based on Newcomb's calculations. A further conference as late as 1950 confirmed Newcomb's constants as the international standard.

Albert Einstein
Albert Einstein (14 March 1879–18 April 1955) explained the anomalous precession of Mercury's perihelion in his 1916 paper The Foundation of the General Theory of Relativity.  This led astronomers to recognize that Newtonian mechanics did not provide the highest accuracy. Binary pulsars have been observed, the first in 1974, whose orbits not only require the use of General Relativity for their explanation, but whose evolution proves the existence of gravitational radiation, a discovery that led to the 1993 Nobel Physics Prize.

Examples of problems

Celestial motion, without additional forces such as drag forces or the thrust of a rocket, is governed by the reciprocal gravitational acceleration between masses. A generalization is the n-body problem, where a number n of masses are mutually interacting via the gravitational force. Although analytically not integrable in the general case, the integration can be well approximated numerically.

Examples:
4-body problem: spaceflight to Mars (for parts of the flight the influence of one or two bodies is very small, so that there we have a 2- or 3-body problem; see also the patched conic approximation)
3-body problem:
Quasi-satellite
Spaceflight to, and stay at a Lagrangian point

In this case, the system is fully integrable and exact solutions can be found.

Examples:
A binary star, e.g., Alpha Centauri (approx. the same mass)
A binary asteroid, e.g., 90 Antiope (approx. the same mass)

A further simplification is based on the "standard assumptions in astrodynamics", which include that one body, the orbiting body, is much smaller than the other, the central body. This is also often approximately valid.

Examples:
The Solar System orbiting the center of the Milky Way
A planet orbiting the Sun
A moon orbiting a planet
A spacecraft orbiting Earth, a moon, or a planet (in the latter cases the approximation only applies after arrival at that orbit)

Perturbation theory

Perturbation theory comprises mathematical methods that are used to find an approximate solution to a problem which cannot be solved exactly. (It is closely related to methods used in numerical analysis, which are ancient.) The earliest use of modern perturbation theory was to deal with the otherwise unsolvable mathematical problems of celestial mechanics: Newton's solution for the orbit of the Moon, which moves noticeably differently from a simple Keplerian ellipse because of the competing gravitation of the Earth and the Sun.

Perturbation methods start with a simplified form of the original problem, which is carefully chosen to be exactly solvable. In celestial mechanics, this is usually a Keplerian ellipse, which is correct when there are only two gravitating bodies (say, the Earth and the Moon), or a circular orbit, which is only correct in special cases of two-body motion, but is often close enough for practical use.

The solved, but simplified problem is then "perturbed" to make its time-rate-of-change equations for the object's position closer to the values from the real problem, such as including the gravitational attraction of a third, more distant body (the Sun). The slight changes that result from the terms in the equations – which themselves may have been simplified yet again – are used as corrections to the original solution. Because simplifications are made at every step, the corrections are never perfect, but even one cycle of corrections often provides a remarkably better approximate solution to the real problem.

There is no requirement to stop at only one cycle of corrections. A partially corrected solution can be re-used as the new starting point for yet another cycle of perturbations and corrections. In principle, for most problems the recycling and refining of prior solutions to obtain a new generation of better solutions could continue indefinitely, to any desired finite degree of accuracy.

The common difficulty with the method is that the corrections usually progressively make the new solutions very much more complicated, so each cycle is much more difficult to manage than the previous cycle of corrections. Newton is reported to have said, regarding the problem of the Moon's orbit "It causeth my head to ache."

This general procedure – starting with a simplified problem and gradually adding corrections that make the starting point of the corrected problem closer to the real situation – is a widely used mathematical tool in advanced sciences and engineering. It is the natural extension of the "guess, check, and fix" method used anciently with numbers.

See also
 Astrometry is a part of astronomy that deals with measuring the positions of stars and other celestial bodies, their distances and movements.
 Astrodynamics is the study and creation of orbits, especially those of artificial satellites.
 Astrophysics
 Celestial navigation is a position fixing technique that was the first system devised to help sailors locate themselves on a featureless ocean.
 Developmental Ephemeris or the Jet Propulsion Laboratory Developmental Ephemeris (JPL DE) is a widely used model of the solar system, which combines celestial mechanics with numerical analysis and astronomical and spacecraft data.
 Dynamics of the celestial spheres concerns pre-Newtonian explanations of the causes of the motions of the stars and planets.
 Dynamical time scale
 Ephemeris is a compilation of positions of naturally occurring astronomical objects as well as artificial satellites in the sky at a given time or times.
 Gravitation
 Lunar theory attempts to account for the motions of the Moon.
 Numerical analysis is a branch of mathematics, pioneered by celestial mechanicians, for calculating approximate numerical answers (such as the position of a planet in the sky) which are too difficult to solve down to a general, exact formula.
 Creating a numerical model of the solar system was the original goal of celestial mechanics, and has only been imperfectly achieved. It continues to motivate research.
 An orbit is the path that an object makes, around another object, whilst under the influence of a source of centripetal force, such as gravity.
 Orbital elements are the parameters needed to specify a Newtonian two-body orbit uniquely.
 Osculating orbit is the temporary Keplerian orbit about a central body that an object would continue on, if other perturbations were not present.
 Retrograde motion is orbital motion in a system, such as a planet and its satellites, that is contrary to the direction of rotation of the central body, or more generally contrary in direction to the net angular momentum of the entire system.
 Apparent retrograde motion is the periodic, apparently backwards motion of planetary bodies when viewed from the Earth (an accelerated reference frame).
 Satellite is an object that orbits another object (known as its primary). The term is often used to describe an artificial satellite (as opposed to natural satellites, or moons). The common noun ‘moon’ (not capitalized) is used to mean any natural satellite of the other planets.
 Tidal force is the combination of out-of-balance forces and accelerations of (mostly) solid bodies that raises tides in bodies of liquid (oceans), atmospheres, and strains planets' and satellites' crusts.
 Two solutions, called VSOP82 and VSOP87 are versions one mathematical theory for the orbits and positions of the major planets, which seeks to provide accurate positions over an extended period of time.

Notes

References

 Forest R. Moulton, Introduction to Celestial Mechanics, 1984, Dover, 
 John E. Prussing, Bruce A. Conway, Orbital Mechanics, 1993, Oxford Univ. Press
 William M. Smart, Celestial Mechanics, 1961, John Wiley. 
 
 J.M.A. Danby, Fundamentals of Celestial Mechanics, 1992, Willmann-Bell
 Alessandra Celletti, Ettore Perozzi, Celestial Mechanics: The Waltz of the Planets, 2007, Springer-Praxis, .
 Michael Efroimsky. 2005. Gauge Freedom in Orbital Mechanics. Annals of the New York Academy of Sciences, Vol. 1065, pp. 346-374
 Alessandra Celletti, Stability and Chaos in Celestial Mechanics. Springer-Praxis 2010, XVI, 264 p., Hardcover

Further reading
Encyclopedia:Celestial mechanics Scholarpedia Expert articles

External links

Astronomy of the Earth's Motion in Space, high-school level educational web site by David P. Stern
Newtonian Dynamics Undergraduate level course by Richard Fitzpatrick. This includes Lagrangian and Hamiltonian Dynamics and applications to celestial mechanics, gravitational potential theory, the 3-body problem and Lunar motion (an example of the 3-body problem with the Sun, Moon, and the Earth).

Research
 Marshall Hampton's research page: Central configurations in the n-body problem

Artwork
 Celestial Mechanics is a Planetarium Artwork created by D. S. Hessels and G. Dunne

Course notes
 Professor Tatum's course notes at the University of Victoria

Associations
 Italian Celestial Mechanics and Astrodynamics Association

Simulations

 
Classical mechanics
Astronomical sub-disciplines
Astrometry